Pauléoula (also spelled Poléoula) is a village in the far west of Ivory Coast. It is in the sub-prefecture of Taï, Taï Department, Cavally Region, Montagnes District. The village is just over three kilometres east of the Cavally River, which is the border with Liberia.

Pauléoula was a commune until March 2012, when it became one of 1126 communes nationwide that were abolished.

The original population of Pauléoula consisted mostly of members of the Oubi ethnic group, a small subgroup of the Krahn or Guéré people. 
A few kilometers east of Pauléoula, within the boundaries of the Taï National Park, lies a small research centre, the 'Institut d'Écologie Tropicale'. It was a lonely house in the forest, not far from this institute, where the Swiss scientist Christophe Boesch in the 1980s conducted his famous research on the behaviour of tool-using Chimpanzees. Later, between 2008–2012, the movie Chimpanzee was filmed here, under difficult conditions, and with Boesch as principal scientific consultant.

Notes

External links
Indexmundi.com

Populated places in Montagnes District
Former communes of Ivory Coast
Populated places in Cavally Region